María José Martínez Sánchez (born 12 August 1982) is a Spanish retired professional tennis player. In singles, she has won five WTA singles titles, her biggest being a Premier 5 title at the 2010 Italian Open where she defeated two former World No. 1 players, Ana Ivanovic and Jelena Janković, en route to the title. As a junior, she won the Orange Bowl and French Open. She reached her career high ranking in singles of World No. 19 on 10 May 2010.

In doubles, Martínez Sánchez has won 21 WTA titles, ten of which came with Nuria Llagostera Vives. Among them are the 2009 WTA Tour Championships, 2009 Rogers Cup and Dubai Tennis Championships 2010–2011. Martínez Sánchez reached a career high doubles ranking of World No. 4 on 5 July 2010.

Career

Martínez Sánchez won the 1999 Orange Bowl, a year-ending tennis event for Juniors. Next year she became the champion of French Open girls' doubles. She made her first Grand Slam draw at the 2001 Australian Open losing to the 3rd seed Venus Williams in 3 sets.

2008

At the 2008 Wimbledon Championships, she advanced to the third round where she lost to eventual champion Venus Williams. In her next Grand Slam, the 2008 US Open, she lost in the first round to Sabine Lisicki.

She finished off the year of a ranking of 87, and only the second time of her career that she finish the year in the top 100 (her first being all the way back in 2001).

2009

Martínez Sánchez started the year playing at the 2009 Australian Open, the first Grand Slam of the year. In the first round, she upset the 32nd seed Tamarine Tanasugarn 7–5, 6–3. She then defeated Akgul Amanmuradova 6–2, 6–4 but lost in the third round to compatriot Carla Suárez Navarro 6–1, 6–4. In doubles, she and Nuria Llagostera Vives were seeded 11th and defeated 6th seeds Yan Zi and Zheng Jie in the third round but they lost a tough match in the quarterfinals to Nathalie Dechy and Mara Santangelo 3–6, 7–6, 7–6.

María José next played at the 2009 Copa Sony Ericsson Colsanitas where she was seeded 7th. She defeated Anastasiya Yakimova, Arantxa Parra Santonja and Betina Jozami to reach the semi-finals where she won a close match against Patricia Mayr 7–5, 7–5. She captured her first WTA singles title when she defeated 3rd seed Gisela Dulko 6–3, 6–2 in the final. In doubles, Martínez Sánchez and Llagostera Vives were the top seeds and they reached the final where they beat second seeds Gisela Dulko and Flavia Pennetta 7–5, 3–6, [10–7] to win their first doubles title of the year.

She reached the third round at Roland Garros. In that match against world number 2 Serena Williams, she was accused of cheating and poor sportsmanship. At 2–2 in the first set, and having a break point at 30–40, Martínez Sánchez hit a drop shot and approached the net. Williams charged, and smashed a backhand, which deflected off of Martínez Sánchez, which appeared to be a winner, and Martínez Sánchez was awarded the point. Williams insisted that the ball had hit Martínez Sánchez's arm, not her racquet (which replays confirmed), but the umpire refused to change the decision. Williams, annoyed, threatened Martínez Sánchez, stating, "I'm gonna get you in the locker room girl, you don’t know me." After the match Williams called her "a cheater". Martínez Sánchez went on to lose the match to Williams 6–4, 3–6, 4–6.

Martínez Sánchez won her second singles title at the year at the 2009 Swedish Open. On the way she defeated 4th seed Kaia Kanepi, Carla Suárez Navarro and Gisela Dulko before beating top seed and World No. 9 Caroline Wozniacki 7–5, 6–4 in the final.

Martínez Sánchez and her partner Nuria Llagostera Vives won the year ending championships in doubles. As the third seeds, they defeated Venus Williams and Serena Williams 2–6, 6–4, [10–8] before winning the biggest title of their careers against World No. 1's Cara Black and Liezel Huber 7–6, 5–7, [10–8] in the final.

Maria qualified to play at the 2009 Commonwealth Bank Tournament of Champions in Bali. She recovered from a first set deficit to beat Szávay in 3 sets 4–6, 6–4, 6–0 in her second group round robin match she beat Stosur in straight sets 7–6, 7–5 where Stosur served a 208kmps world record serve. In the semifinal she lost against Aravane Rezaï 6–2, 6–3, who clearly outplayed her on that day.

Overall, Martínez Sánchez had the greatest year of her career. The highlights were winning two singles WTA titles at Bogotá and Båstad (Sweden)  and by reaching the third rounds at the Australian Open, French Open, US Open. She ended the year ranked World No. 30.

In doubles, she won seven titles with Nuria Llagostera Vives at Bogotá, Acapulco, Barcelona, Palermo, Toronto, New Haven and the most important, the WTA Tour Championships in Doha. She ended the year ranked World No. 5.

2010

Her first tournament of the year was winning the Hopman Cup with partner Tommy Robredo. They reached the Final after defeating top seeds Australia, the United States, and Romania without losing a single match. However, she had a shock loss to young British prospect Laura Robson but was able to secure a 2–1 win for Spain.

Martínez Sánchez was seeded 24th at the 2010 Australian Open but lost in the second round to World No. 35 Zheng Jie 2–6, 6–2, 6–3.

At Indian Wells, she entered in the second round against A. Dulgheru and struggled through in three sets, 2–6, 6–3, 6–1. Then she went on winning in straight sets over Belarusian Victoria Azarenka in the third round, 7–6, 6–2, and another straight sets win over Belgian Yanina Wickmayer in the fourth round 6–4, 6–4. In the quarterfinals she was defeated by Samantha Stosur in straight sets, 3–6, 6–7.

Martínez Sánchez major breakthrough tournament came at the Italian Open, a Premier 5 event in Rome where nine of the top ten women were competing. She upset World No. 17 Francesca Schiavone, World No. 2 Caroline Wozniacki and then Lucie Šafářová in straight sets. She then defeated Ana Ivanovic in the semifinals 6–4, 6–2 and went on to beat World No. 7 Jelena Janković in the final 7–6, 7–5 to win the biggest title of her career so far. Due to her impressive performance in Rome, she became a top 20 player for the first time, at No.19. However, she was unable to carry any momentum at all into the 2010 French Open, suffering defeat in the first round, because her neck was injured while she was training the same day and she could hardly move the neck in the match.

She returned in Eastbourne, winning the first match against Vera Zvonareva and the second round again Aravane Rezaï. She was defeated in the quarterfinals by Marion Bartoli in a really hard match. But more bad luck came to María once again when her leg was injured due to bad movement before her quarterfinals doubles match. This time would be worse for she would miss Wimbledon and most of the summer season, before returning in New Haven and losing in the first round against wildcard Elena Dementieva.

In the 2010 US Open, she failed to repeat her 3rd round finish of the previous year, losing in the 2nd round against Patty Schnyder in a tight match  7–6, 6–4. Overall the result was good for Martínez Sánchez who had made a lot unforced errors and Schnyder who had her best match in the past few months.

2011

Martínez Sánchez started off the year at the 2011 Medibank International Sydney where she defeated Daniela Hantuchová in the first round 6–2, 6–4 before setting up a meeting with Alisa Kleybanova where she lost 6–2, 6–4. In the 2011 Australian Open Martínez Sánchez was seeded 26.  In the first round she faced Gréta Arn who had recently won the 2011 ASB Classic event in Auckland. Martínez Sánchez won against Arn although was subsequently defeated by Frenchwoman Alizé Cornet in the second round.

At the 2011 Wimbledon Championships, Martínez Sánchez came from a set down to upset 15th seed Jelena Janković in the first round. She then made quick work of Romanian Monica Niculescu in the following match. She lost to 23rd seed and 5-time Wimbledon champion Venus Williams in the third round.

She has earned two International Championships in 2011.  In July, Martínez Sánchez defeated Patricia Mayr-Achleitner 6–0, 7–4 at the Bad Gastein Ladies in Bad Gastein, Austria.  She followed that win with a 7–6, 7–6 victory over Galina Voskoboeva at the Hansol Korea Open in September.

2012
2012 was a year of injury and struggles for Martínez Sánchez as she consequently fell out of the top 150 in singles.

After withdrawing from the Australian Open with a left knee injury, she failed to win a main draw match until the French Open, where she reached the 3rd round losing to 15th seed Dominika Cibulková, 2–6, 1–6. Martínez Sánchez experienced even more success in doubles where she reached the semis with Nuria Llagostera Vives losing to eventual champions and 4th seeds Sara Errani and Roberta Vinci.

Martínez Sánchez lost to Laura Robson and Ana Ivanovic both in 3 sets, at the Aegon International and Wimbledon respectively, the first sending her out of the top 50. However, in doubles, again with Llagostera Vives, they won in Eastbourne without dropping a set and defeating the top 2 seeds, but they lost in the quarterfinals of Wimbledon to Flavia Pennetta and Francesca Schiavone in a tough three-setter.

At the 2012 Summer Olympics, Martínez Sánchez defeated Polona Hercog 6–4, 6–2, before being routed out by Victoria Azarenka 1–6, 2–6. She and Llagostera Vives routed Casey Dellacqua and Samantha Stosur 6–1, 6–1, before falling to Peng Shuai and Zheng Jie 4–6, 2–6.

The Spaniard then lost in the first round of both singles and doubles in tough matches at Montreal. She fell out of the top 100 of singles following the loss to Carla Suárez Navarro.

Despite falling first round again in singles in Cincinnati, Martínez Sánchez and Llagostera Vives were pushed in the first round by Olga Govortsova and Alla Kudryavtseva, but fell to 8th seeds Katarina Srebotnik and Zheng Jie 4–6, 3–6.

A good run at the US Open caused her to bounce back into the top 100 of singles and the top 15 of doubles. After a tough first round match with fellow veteran Mirjana Lučić winning 6–3, 7–5, she pushed eventual champ Serena Williams 6–2, 6–4. The scoreline was easier than it looks however. After a series of tough wins with Llagostera Vives in doubles, they met the eventual champions Sara Errani and Roberta Vinci falling 2–6, 3–6.

Entering the 2012 Hansol Korea Open as the defending champion, she played well defeating Eleni Daniilidou, and Nadia Petrova via walkover, but lost in the quarterfinals where she was routed by Ekaterina Makarova 1–6, 1–6. The loss sent her sprawling out of the top 100 to 137. Martínez Sánchez then lost in the first round of qualies at Tokyo, Beijing, and Osaka. In Osaka, she managed to push 2nd seed Zheng Jie to a tough three-setter losing 6–4, 5–7, 4–6 despite going up a set and 5–2.

2015
After giving birth in November 2013 to a daughter, Andrea, she returned on the main tour in the Miami Open doubles draw pairing with Vera Dushevina.

2019 
Alongside partner Neal Skupski, the Spaniard was beaten in her mixed doubles semi-final in the Australian Open 2019.

Significant finals

Year-end championships finals

Doubles: 1 (1 title)

Tier I / Premier Mandatory & Premier 5 finals

Singles: 1 (1 title)

Doubles: 7 (3 titles, 4 runners-up)

WTA career finals

Singles: 6 (5 titles, 1 runner-up)

Doubles: 35 (21 titles, 14 runners-up)

ITF Circuit finals

Singles (12–8)

Doubles (23–16)

Team events (1)

Performance timelines

Singles

Doubles

References

External links

 
 
 

1982 births
Living people
Tennis players from the Region of Murcia
People from Yecla
Spanish female tennis players
Tennis players at the 2008 Summer Olympics
Tennis players at the 2012 Summer Olympics
Olympic tennis players of Spain
Hopman Cup competitors
Grand Slam (tennis) champions in girls' doubles
Mediterranean Games silver medalists for Spain
Competitors at the 2001 Mediterranean Games
Mediterranean Games medalists in tennis
French Open junior champions